Route 13 may refer to:
 One of several highways - see List of highways numbered 13
 One of several public transport routes - see List of public transport routes numbered 13